Emile d'Erlanger may refer to:

 Frédéric Emile d'Erlanger, Franco-German banker
 Baron Emile Beaumont d'Erlanger, his Anglo-French son
 Emile Erlanger and Company, their family bank